Bobai is a county of Guangxi, China. It is under the administration of Yulin city.

Bobai was the home town of the linguist Wang Li, who described the Bobai dialect with its unusually large number of tones.

Transportation
The county is served by the Yulin–Tieshangang railway. The railway opened for freight service in May 2015. Passenger service to Bobai railway station started on April 1, 2016.

Contestation and protests

In May 2007, Bobai was the site of large protests held by local people against China's one-child policy, and triggered the protest in Yangmei, Rongxian.

The small office of a grassroots NGO for sex workers' rights was ransacked and its leader Ye Haiyan was also attacked.

Climate

References

 
Counties of Guangxi
Yulin, Guangxi